Democratic Arucasian Union (in Spanish: Unión Aruquense Democrática) is a political party in the municipality of Arucas, Gran Canaria, Canary Islands. The UAD was registered in 2002. The general secretary of the party is Bonifacio Calero Santana.

In the 2003 municipal elections in Arucas, UAD got 865 votes (4.32%), but failed to win any seat.

In the 2004 Spanish legislative elections, UAD stood on the lists of the Alternative for Gran Canaria (AxGC). Calero was number 2 on the list of AxGC for the Senate and party colleague Margarita Soledad Hernández Suárez was number 4 on the AxGC list for the Congress.

See also
 MPAIAC
 CNC
 Popular Front of the Canary Islands (Frepic-Awañak)

Political parties in the Canary Islands